Yamaha DT400B is an enduro or Dual-sport motorcycle 2 stroke motorcycle which was introduced by the Yamaha Motor Company in 1975 and was produced until 1979.

Specifications
The DT400B utilized a 2 stroke air cooled 397CC engine which put out 23hp. The engine used a kick start. It was chain driven with drum brakes. The motorcycle had lights and turn signals, and it was made to operate off road and on road. It weighed 289 pounds. When introduced in 1975 it had a list price of $1371 US dollars.

History
Yamaha produced the enduro DT1 250 in 1968. The motorcycle was embraced and Yamaha learned that, in America riders were interested in motorcycles which could operate off road, and on road. Yamaha experimented with larger displacement and in 1975 they created the DT400B. The DT400B did not initially sell well, and Yamaha reduced the price. The 2 stroke engine was not ideal and by 1979 the DT400B was discontinued.

References

DT400
1975 introductions
Two-stroke motorcycles
Off-road motorcycles